Lynx Air, legally incorporated as 1263343 Alberta Inc., is a Canadian ultra-low-cost carrier based in Calgary, Alberta. It previously operated as Enerjet and was rebranded as Lynx Air on November 16, 2021. The first flight under the Lynx Air name took place on April 7, 2022, operating from Calgary International Airport to Vancouver International Airport.

History

Enerjet

Enerjet was originally formed in 2006 by a small group of entrepreneurs addressing what they perceived to be a gap in the service provided by Canada's major airlines, WestJet and Air Canada in "middle Canada". It was initially known as New Air & Tours until October 20, 2008, when New Air & Tours revealed its name and corporate logo to be styled as Enerjet. Enerjet was founded by nine individuals, including Tim Morgan, the former senior vice president of WestJet. On November 28, 2008, Enerjet received an Air Operator's Certificate (AOC) and Air Operators License issued by the Canadian Transportation Agency. While the airline initially planned to launch as a scheduled low-cost carrier (LCC), the airline focused instead on charter operations involving the transport of employees of oil companies, such as for Suncor Energy, as well as ad-hoc charter services for Air Transat, deeming the leisure travel market to be competitive following the collapse of Zoom Airlines, as well as the presence of leisure carriers such as WestJet.

By 2012, the airline was still seeking investment to expand into scheduled LCC operations, and had operated some flights between Calgary and Vancouver during peak holiday travel periods, with plans to expand the services to Kelowna and Edmonton. By 2016, the airline had gone through two tentative names for its LCC project, consisting of Jet Naked and FlyToo. In late 2018, the airline announced it had attracted investors in order to transition from chartered flights to scheduled operations, one of which included Indigo Partners, which had notably invested in other LCCs including Frontier Airlines, JetSmart, Volaris, and Wizz Air, and Enerjet subsequently planned to relaunch as an LCC during 2019.

Lynx Air
On November 16, 2021, the company revealed its new name as Lynx Air, with plans to begin flying in the first quarter of 2022. During the announcement, the airline made commitments for up to 46 Boeing 737 MAX 8 aircraft over the next seven years to meet the anticipated demand, with deliveries starting in early 2022, and that it would follow the low-cost carrier model for its operations. The airline additionally announced it would initially operate domestic routes with plans to later add international destinations. On April 7, 2022, Lynx Air's first flights launched. The airline announced its first international destinations on September 28, 2022, with flights to the United States beginning in early 2023.

Management
Merren McArthur is the airline's President and Chief Executive Officer (CEO). She previously served as CEO for both Tigerair Australia and Virgin Australia Regional Airlines, and founding CEO of Virgin Australia Cargo.

Vijay Bathija is the airline's Chief Commercial Officer (CCO), with prior experience at Etihad Airways and Air Canada Rouge.

Tim Morgan is the airline's Chief Operations Officer (COO) and Founder. He previously served as Senior Vice President of WestJet, with additional prior experience at Morgan Air LLP/Air Partners/Aircraft Works, and Lynx's predecessor Enerjet.

Michael Holditch is the airline's Chief Financial Officer (CFO), having previously been the CFO of Enerjet.

Destinations
, Lynx Air operates to the following destinations:

Prior to rebranding as Lynx Air and operating scheduled services, the airline operated charter flights on demand to various destinations as Enerjet.

Fleet

Current
, Lynx Air operates the following aircraft:

Previous
As Enerjet, the airline previously operated the following aircraft:

Fleet development
As Enerjet, the airline operated a fleet of Boeing 737-700 aircraft for its charter operations, with a single 737-800 leased from Transavia on occasion, before the 737-700s were retired by 2017. After retiring its 737-700s, Enerjet subsequently retained an inactive DHC-6 Twin Otter fleet in order to keep its AOC, while the airline underwent its subsequent transformation from chartered to scheduled operations in the coming years. When the airline eventually announced its rebranding as Lynx Air in November 2021, the airline announced that it had ordered 46 Boeing 737 MAX 8 aircraft for delivery through 2028. In March 2022, the airline announced it had ordered an additional 11 737 MAX 8s.

See also
List of airlines of Canada

References

External links

 

Airlines of Canada
2006 establishments in Alberta
Airlines established in 2006
Companies based in Calgary
Low-cost carriers